Maria Rosenkranz (Mary Rosary) is a Catholic church in Frankfurt-Seckbach, part of Frankfurt am Main. It was completed in 1953. On 1 January 2015 the parish became a Kirchort (church location), part of the parish St. Josef Frankfurt am Main. The parish church of the Seckbach congregation is part of the Roman Catholic Diocese of Limburg.

Logos

History 
After World War II, the Catholic population of Seckbach grew, and a new church was planned to meet the need. It was designed by the Frankfurt architects  and Carl Rummel. The ground-breaking was on 16 December 1951. The consecration was on 27 September 1953 by Weihbischof . It became part of the "Pfarrei neuen Typs" (new type parish) St. Josef in Bornheim on 1 Januar 2015, along with Heilig-Kreuz in Bornheim, Heilig Geist in Riederwald and Herz Jesu in Frankfurt-Fechenheim.

It was replaced by a new organ in 1977.

On 1 January 2015, four parishes were combined to St. Josef, with locations (Kirchort) , Maria Rosenkranz, Heilig Geist and Herz Jesu.

Literature 
 Folker Rochelmeyer: Seckbach und seine Umgebung., Frankfurter Sparkasse von 1822 – Polytechnische Gesellschaft (ed.). 1972, 84 p., illustrated.
 Folker Rochelmeyer: Festschrift 1100 Jahre Seckbach, 880–1980. 1980, 151 p., illustrated (chronicle).
 Walter Sauer: Seckbacher Geschichte(n), Ein Heimatbuch. Kultur- und Geschichtsverein 1954 Frankfurt a. M.-Seckbach (ed.). 2000, 164 p., illustrated.
 50 Jahre Kultur- und Geschichtsverein 1954 Frankfurt a. M.-Seckbach e. V. Kultur- und Geschichtsverein 1954 Frankfurt a. M.-Seckbach (ed.). 2004, 53 p., illustrated.

References

External links 

 
 Homepage der Pfarrei St. Josef Frankfurt am Main
 Kultur- und Geschichtsverein 1954 Frankfurt a. M.-Seckbach e. V.

Roman Catholic churches in Frankfurt
Roman Catholic churches completed in 1953
Churches in the Diocese of Limburg
20th-century Roman Catholic church buildings in Germany